The bronze-tailed peacock-pheasant (Polyplectron chalcurum) is also known as the Sumatran peacock-pheasant.  It is an Indonesian bird.

Description
The bronze-tailed peacock-pheasant is a small, up to 56 cm long, dark brown pheasant with dark grey legs, rather small head and long, narrow tail of sixteen feathers. The tail feathers are chestnut brown with metallic purplish bars near tips. Both sexes are similar. The male has longer tail, two spurs on legs and yellow iris while the unspurred female's is dark brown.

Taxonomy and evolution
The bronze-tailed peacock-pheasant belongs to the family Phasianidae and the genus  Polyplectron, which consists of seven peacock-pheasant species. There are two subspecies:
 P. c. chalcurum, described by Lesson in 1831, which is known as the southern bronze-tailed peacock-pheasant.
 P. c. scutulatum, described by Hoogerwerf in 1941, which is known as the northern bronze-tailed peacock-pheasant.

mtDNA cytochrome b and D-loop as well as the nuclear ovomucoid intron G data confirms that this species belongs to a clade together with the mountain peacock-pheasant, but also the mainland species Germain's peacock-pheasant and grey peacock-pheasant (Kimball et al. 2001).

The molecular data suggests - though not with high confidence - that this species diverged relatively recently from ancestral grey peacock-pheasants. This is quite spurious, since biogeography, its peculiarly derived plumage, and the fact that it is an insular mountain endemic indicate it is derived from a comparatively small founder population; this would confound molecular analyses. What seems clear is that the present species evolved from mainland Southeast Asian stock, probably during the Late Pliocene to Early Pleistocene (3.6-1 mya). The loss of ocelli thus is, contrary to long-held opinion, an autapomorphy, and the southern species of this clade - formerly separated in the genus Chalcurus - are probably not each other's closest relatives.

Distribution and habitat
An Indonesian endemic, the bronze-tailed peacock-pheasant inhabits to mountain forests of west Sumatra.

Behaviour
As with other member in the genus, this elusive bird is shy and very wary. But unlike other peacock-pheasants, it has no ocelli.

Conservation
The bronze-tailed peacock-pheasant is evaluated as Least Concern on the IUCN Red List of Threatened Species.

References

External links 
 BirdLife Species Factsheet

bronze-tailed peacock-pheasant
Birds of Sumatra
bronze-tailed peacock-pheasant
Taxa named by René Lesson